Quảng Xương is a district (huyện) of Thanh Hóa province in the North Central Coast region of Vietnam.

As of 2012 the district had a population of 245,000. The district covers an area of 228 km². The district capital lies at Tân Phong.

References

Districts of Thanh Hóa province